Falcidens is one of three genera within the family Chaetodermatida; its radula consists of a single row of teeth which are mineralized in crystalline hydroxyapatite (a most unusual mineral in organisms), and its teeth are not periodically shed and replaced like in other molluscs.
 For details of the radula, see Radula#In caudofoveates.

It contains the following species:

 Falcidens acutargatus Salvini-Plawen, 1992
 Falcidens aequabilis Salvini-Plawen, 1972
 Falcidens caudatus Heath, 1918)
 Falcidens chiastos Scheltema, 1989
 Falcidens crossotus Salvini-Plawen, 1968
 Falcidens gutturosus Kowalewsky, 1901)
 Falcidens halanychi Schander, Scheltema & Ivanov, 2006
 Falcidens hartmanae Schwabl, 1961)
 Falcidens hoffmanni Stork, 1939)
 Falcidens indicus Stork, 1941)
 Falcidens ingolfensis Salvini-Plawen, 1971
 Falcidens limifossorides Salvini-Plawen, 1986
 Falcidens liosqueameus Salvini-Plawen, 1969
 Falcidens lipuros Scheltema, 1989
 Falcidens longus Scheltema, 1998
 Falcidens loveni Nierstrasz, 1902)
 Falcidens macracanthos Scheltema, 1998
 Falcidens macrafrondis Scheltema, 1989
 Falcidens nontargatus Salvini-Plawen, 1992
 Falcidens normanni Nierstrasz, 1903)
 Falcidens poias Scheltema, 1995
 Falcidens profundus Salvini-Plawen, 1968
 Falcidens sagittiferus Salvini-Plawen, 1968
 Falcidens sterreri Salvini-Plawen, 1967)
 Falcidens strigisquamatus Salvini-Plawen, 1977)
 Falcidens targatus Salvini-Plawen, 1986
 Falcidens targotegulatus Salvini-Plawen, 1992
 Falcidens thorensis Salvini-Plawen, 1971
 Falcidens vasconiensis Salvini-Plawen, 1996
 Falcidens wireni Nierstrasz, 1902)

References

Aplacophorans